Cape Clear may refer to:
 Cape Clear (software company)
 Cape Clear Island, on the southern coast of Ireland
 Cape Clear, Victoria, a town in Australia